SARP or Sarp may refer to:

 Sarp, French commune
 Sarp, Hopa, village in Turkey
 Sarp (musician), a Turkish rock musician
 Sarpsborg, a city in Norway
 Skinheads Against Racial Prejudice (more commonly abbreviated as SHARP)
 Standards And Recommended Practices, the technical specifications adopted by the Council of ICAO
 Association of Polish Architects, Polish architectural organization

People with the given name
 Sarp Akkaya (born 1980), Turkish actor

People with the surname
 Mustafa Sarp, Turkish footballer

Turkish-language surnames